Frederick Riley may refer to:

Frederick Riley (footballer) (1912–1942), English footballer
Frederick Fox Riley (1869–1934), British politician
Frederick Riley (trade unionist) (1886–1970), Australian politician